Steve Zatylny is a former Canadian football wide receiver who played two seasons with the Winnipeg Blue Bombers of the Canadian Football League. He was drafted by the Winnipeg Blue Bombers in the sixth round of the 1990 CFL Draft. He first enrolled at Vanier College before transferring to Bishop's University. Steve brother Wally also played in the CFL.

College career

Vanier College
Zatylny played for the Vanier Cheetahs from 1984 to 1985.

Bishop's University
Zatylny played CIS football for the Bishop's Gaiters.

Professional career

Winnipeg Blue Bombers
Zatylny was selected by the Winnipeg Blue Bombers with the 43rd pick in the 1990 CFL Draft. He played for the Blue Bombers from 1990 to 1991, winning the 78th Grey Cup in 1990.

References

External links
Just Sports Stats

1966 births
Living people
Canadian football wide receivers
Bishop's Gaiters football players
Winnipeg Blue Bombers players
Players of Canadian football from Quebec